The Cathedral of the Holy Trinity in Blaj, Romania is a Romanian Greek Catholic cathedral commissioned by bishop Inocențiu Micu-Klein in 1738.  The church was built by Viennese architects Anton Erhard Martinelli and Johann Baptist Martinelli, being completed in 1749.

The building was extended in 1838, when the two monumental towers were added.

References

B
Baroque church buildings in Romania
B
Tourist attractions in Alba County
Blaj
Churches completed in 1749
18th-century Catholic church buildings
Romanian Greek Catholic Major Archeparchy of Făgăraș and Alba Iulia